David Simon  (born December 2, 1979) is an American former rower. He competed in the men's eight event at the 2000 Summer Olympics.

References

External links
 

1979 births
Living people
American male rowers
Olympic rowers of the United States
Rowers at the 2000 Summer Olympics
Sportspeople from Oakland County, Michigan
Pan American Games medalists in rowing
Pan American Games gold medalists for the United States
Rowers at the 1999 Pan American Games
Medalists at the 1999 Pan American Games